Arthur Augustus Cutler Moore (August 25, 1880 – January 7, 1935) was an elite amateur ice hockey defenceman for the Ottawa Hockey Club during the era that it was known as the Silver Seven from 1903 to 1906. The club won the Stanley Cup in March 1903 and held it through numerous challenges until March 1906.

He also played rugby football with the Ottawa Rough Riders.

Personal life
Moore married Flossie Bryson in 1912. The couple had three children, including daughter Jean, daughter Helen and son Arthur Jr.

Playing career

Career statistics

Moore missed most of the 1907 season due to a broken ankle. He was released after two games in the 1908 season.

References
 

1880 births
1935 deaths
People from Halton Hills
Ottawa Senators (original) players
Ice hockey people from Ontario
Canadian ice hockey defencemen
Ottawa Rough Riders players